Kalyani Natarajan is an Indian actress who has appeared in Telugu, Tamil, and Hindi-language films. She played prominent roles in Saivam (2014), Pisaasu (2014) and Mahanubhavudu (2017).

Career 
Kalyani had an interest in theatre and acted in plays in Mumbai. While in Mumbai, she was part of several major drama troupes. Later, she began acting in commercials including a jewellery commercial with Trisha.

Her stage plays in Mumbai enabled her to get a role in Settai (2013), which was shot in Mumbai. In the same year, she played Imran Khan's sister-in-law in Dharma Productions' Gori Tere Pyaar Mein (2013). She was also cast as Sathyaraj's wife in A. L. Vijay's Thalaivaa (2013). However, she left the latter film.

She collaborated again with director A. L. Vijay for Saivam (2014), which was her first major break. Kalyani had shot for 38 days in Karaikudi for the film. While she was in Chennai during the release of Saivam, she met director Mysskin and auditioned for a role in Pisaasu (2014), a role which she bagged. Atlee Kumar signed her to play a doctor in Theri (2016) after seeing her performance in Pisaasu.

Kalyani made her Telugu film debut with Dictator (2016) and has acted in Mahanubhavudu (2017), Vijetha (2018), Dear Comrade (2019) amongst others. She is one of the most prominent and sought-after actors to play maternal roles in several films.

Her short film debut was with Daro Mat (2017) in which she played a toxic mother-in-law. She is one of the founding members of a Mumbai-based theatre production house Clean Slate Creations along with her husband Balakrishnan Natarajan, who is also an actor in Hindi cinema.

Filmography

Tamil films

Telugu films

Hindi films

References

External links 

Living people
Year of birth missing (living people)
21st-century Indian actresses
Indian film actresses